Harkirat Singh is a former major general in the Indian Army. As the general officer commanding 54th Infantry Division, Singh served as the first commander of the Indian Peace Keeping Force during its deployment in Sri Lanka in 1987.

References

People of the Indian Peace Keeping Force
Indian generals
Living people
Year of birth missing (living people)